"Crying in the Chapel" is a 1953 song by Artie Glenn.

Crying in the Chapel may also refer to:

 Crying in the Chapel (album), 2001 album by Country Gentlemen
 "Crying in the Chapel" (Peter Blakeley song), 1990 song by Peter Blakeley